(1892-1970) was a Japanese anarchist and Esperantist. Taiji Yamaga was born in 1892 to a printing family in Kyoto. Yamaga moved to Tokyo, where he studied Esperanto with historian and Esperantis Katsumu Kuroita. At age sixteen, Yamaga served as the secretary of Kuroita's Japan Esperanto Society. In 1911,  Yamaga was introduced to anarchist Sakae Osugi.
 Yamaga became an assistant to anarchist Osugi. At Osugi's request, Yamaga visited Chinese anarchist Liu Shifu and his comrades in Shanghai. He stayed at Shifu's HQ for several weeks. Shifu invited Yamaga to help him publish the journal Minsheng.

Yamaga returned to Japan to help with the publication of the Heimin Shimbun. In 1922, Yamaga was able secure Osugi a false passport.

Beginning in 1939, he lived in Shanghai, Kaohsiung, Taipei, and Manila. He returned to Kyoto in 1946. In 1960, Yamaga attended the tenth international meeting of the War Resisters' International in India. In 1962, Yamaga began writing an illustrated memoirs entitled The Twilight Journal. The Yamaga Manga.
 He died on December 6, 1970.

He is survived by his wife Mika Shigehara.

References

Further reading

External links
 YAMAGA Taiji  at the Dictionnaire des militants anarchistes
 Taiji Yamaga at the L'Ephemeride Anarchiste

1892 births
1970 deaths
Japanese anarchists
People from Kyoto